Captain Blood Returns is a 1931 British historical adventure novel by the Anglo-Italian writer Rafael Sabatini. It is the second in Sabatini's trilogy about the character after Captain Blood (1922) and was followed by The Fortunes of Captain Blood (1936).

Film adaptation
The novel provided a loose inspiration for the 1952 film Captain Pirate made by Columbia Pictures and starring Louis Hayward and Patricia Medina. This was made as a sequel to the 1950 film Fortunes of Captain Blood.

References

Bibliography
 Goble, Alan. The Complete Index to Literary Sources in Film. Walter de Gruyter, 1999.

1931 British novels
British historical novels
British adventure novels
Novels set in the 17th century
Novels by Rafael Sabatini
British novels adapted into films
Houghton Mifflin books